This is a list of all the A-League Men finals series that have occurred. The inaugural series was in 2006 and the latest was in 2021.

Standard cup rules – such as the away goals rule (two-leg ties only), extra time and penalty shootouts – are used to decide drawn games. The higher ranked team from the regular season hosts games if there is only one leg. Winners are in bold.

2006 

After the home and away season, the inaugural A-League finals series began, with the top four teams from the league ladder qualifying. The finals series used a modified Page playoff system, with the difference that each first-round game would be played over two legs. The winner of the finals series, Sydney FC were crowned inaugural A-League champions with the Joe Marston Medal going to Dwight Yorke. As holder of the top position on the league ladder, Adelaide United were named the 2005–06 A-League premiers. Both of these clubs then qualified for the 2007 AFC Champions League due to their achievements.

Semi-finals

Preliminary final

Grand Final

2007 

For the second straight year, the finals series again used a modified Page playoff system with the top four teams from the 2006–07 A-League ladder qualifying. Each of the first-round games was played over two legs. The winner of the finals series, Melbourne Victory were crowned 2006–07 A-League champions with the Joe Marston Medal going to Archie Thompson. As holder of the top position on the league ladder, Victory were also named the 2006–07 A-League premiers. These accomplishments qualified them for the 2008 AFC Champions League alongside Adelaide United, who got in through being runners up.

Semi-finals

Preliminary final

Grand Final

2008 

For the third straight year, the finals series used a modified Page playoff system, again with each first-round game being played over two legs and with four teams. The winner of the finals series, the Newcastle Jets were crowned 2007–08 A-League champions with the Joe Marston Medal going to Andrew Durante. The Central Coast Mariners, as the holder of the top position on the league ladder, were named the 2007–08 premiers. They both qualified for the 2009 AFC Champions League due to their achievements.

Note: The Grand Final was held at the Sydney Football Stadium as the FFA deemed Bluetongue Stadium to have an insufficient capacity for the league's showpiece match.

Semi-finals

Preliminary final

Grand Final

2009 
For the fourth straight year, the finals series used a modified Page playoff system, again with each first-round game being played over two legs and with the top four teams. The winner of the finals series, the Melbourne Victory were crowned 2008–09 A-League champions with the Joe Marston Medal going to Tom Pondeljak. As holders of the top position on the league ladder, Melbourne Victory were also named the 2008–09 premiers. Them and Adelaide United both qualified for the 2010 AFC Champions League, Adelaide United qualifying for being runners up.

Semi-finals

Preliminary final

Grand Final

2010 
After four straight years, the finals series adapted a new modified Page playoff system, with the amount of finals teams being increased to 6. The winner of the finals series, Sydney FC were crowned 2009–10 A-League champions with the Joe Marston Medal going to Simon Colosimo. As holders of the top position on the league ladder, Sydney FC were also named the 2009–10 premiers. Them and Melbourne Victory both qualified for the 2011 AFC Champions League, Melbourne Victory qualifying for being runners up.

Semi-finals

Preliminary final

Grand Final

2011 

For the second straight year, the finals series used the same 6 team modified Page playoff system it adopted the previous year. The winner of the finals series, Brisbane Roar were crowned 2010–11 A-League champions with the Joe Marston Medal going to Mathew Ryan, making him the first recipient of the award to play on the losing team. As holders of the top position on the league ladder, Central Coast Mariners were also named the 2010–11 premiers. Their accomplishments qualified them into the 2012 AFC Champions League, which for the first time featured 3 Australian teams. The third team was Adelaide United, who qualified through finishing the regular season in third.

Semi-finals

Preliminary final

Grand Final

2012 
For the second straight year, the finals series used the same 6 team modified Page playoff system it adopted in the 2009–10 season. The winner of the finals series, Brisbane Roar were crowned 2011–12 A-League champions with the Joe Marston Medal going to Jacob Burns, making him the second recipient of the award to play on the losing team. As holders of the top position on the league ladder, Central Coast Mariners were also named the 2011–12 premiers. Their accomplishments qualified them into the 2013 AFC Champions League, which was reverted to only having two A-League teams (Brisbane Roar qualifying through the 2013 AFC Champions League qualifying play-offs).

Semi-finals

Preliminary final

Grand Final

2013 

For the first time, the A-League adopted a new knock-out format for the finals with six teams competing over a three-week series instead of four and the top two teams no longer receive a double chance. Instead they received the opening week of the final series off and only needed to win one game to make the grand final. Central Coast Mariners were crowned 2012–13 A-League champions, after beating Western Sydney Wanderers 2–0 with Daniel McBreen taking out the Joe Marston Medal. The Wanderers were named 2012–13 premiers, after finishing top of the regular season ladder in their inaugural season. Those two teams, due to their accomplishments, qualified for the 2014 AFC Champions League, with the AFC deciding to revert the amount of Champions League teams back to three, the third team being Melbourne Victory, who entered in the 3rd round of qualifiers because they finished third in the regular season. The Wanderers went on to win the tournament, becoming the first Australian team to do so.

Note: The Grand Final was held at the Sydney Football Stadium as the FFA deemed Parramatta Stadium to have an insufficient capacity for the league's showpiece match.

Elimination Finals

Semi-finals

Grand Final

2014 
For the second straight year, the finals series used the same six team knock-out finals system it adopted in the 2012–13 season. The winner of the finals series, Brisbane Roar were crowned 2013–14 A-League champions with the Joe Marston Medal going to Thomas Broich and Iacopo La Rocca, making it the first year with joint winners. As holders of the top position on the league ladder, Brisbane Roar were also named the 2013–14 premiers. Their accomplishments qualified them into the 2015 AFC Champions League, alongside Western Sydney Wanderers (for finishing second on the league ladder). Central Coast Mariners came third and qualified for the 2016 AFC Champions League qualifying play-offs.

Elimination Finals

Semi-finals

Grand Final

2015 
For the third straight year, the finals series used the same six team knock-out finals system it adopted in the 2012-13 season. The winner of the finals series, Melbourne Victory were crowned 2011–12 A-League champions with the Joe Marston Medal going to Mark Milligan. As holders of the top position on the league ladder, Melbourne Victory were also named the 2011–12 premiers. Their accomplishments qualified them into the 2016 AFC Champions League, along with Sydney FC (for finishing second on the league ladder). Adelaide United came third and qualified for the 2016 AFC Champions League qualifying play-offs.

Elimination Finals

Semi-finals

Grand Final

2016 

For the fourth straight year, the finals series used the same six team knock-out finals system it adopted in the 2012–13 season. The winner of the finals series, Adelaide United were crowned 2015–16 A-League champions with the Joe Marston Medal going to Isaías. As holders of the top position on the league ladder, Adelaide United were also named the 2015–16 premiers. Their accomplishments qualified them into the 2017 AFC Champions League, along with Western Sydney Wanderers (for finishing second on the league ladder). Brisbane Roar came third and qualified for the 2017 AFC Champions League qualifying play-offs.

Elimination Finals

Semi-finals

Grand Final

2017 
For the fifth straight year, the finals series used the same six team knock-out finals system it adopted in the 2012–13 season. The winner of the finals series, Sydney FC were crowned 2016–17 A-League champions with the Joe Marston Medal going to Daniel Georgievski, making him the third recipient of the award to play on the losing team. As holders of the top position on the league ladder, Sydney FC were also named the 2016–17 premiers. Their accomplishments qualified them into the 2017 AFC Champions League, along with Melbourne Victory (for finishing second on the league ladder). Brisbane Roar came third and qualified for the 2017 AFC Champions League qualifying play-offs

Elimination Finals

Semi-finals

Grand Final

2018 

For the sixth straight year, the finals series used the same six team knock-out finals system it adopted in the 2012–13 season. The winner of the finals series, Melbourne Victory were crowned 2017–18 A-League champions with the Joe Marston Medal going to Lawrence Thomas. As holders of the top position on the league ladder, Sydney FC were named the 2017–18 premiers. Due to both teams' accomplishments, they qualified into the 2019 AFC Champions League. Newcastle Jets came second and qualified for the 2019 AFC Champions League preliminary round 2.

Elimination Finals

Semi-finals

Grand Final

2019 

For the seventh straight year, the finals series used the same six team knock-out finals system it adopted in the 2012–13 season. The winner of the finals series, Sydney FC were crowned 2018–19 A-League champions with the Joe Marston Medal going to Miloš Ninković. As holders of the top position on the league ladder, Perth Glory were named the 2018–19 premiers. Their accomplishments qualified them into the 2020 AFC Champions League alongside Melbourne Victory, who came third and qualified for the 2020 AFC Champions League qualifying play-offs.

Elimination Finals

Semi-finals

Grand Final

2020 
For the eighth straight year, the finals series used the same six team knock-out finals system it adopted in the 2012–13 season. The winner of the finals series, Sydney FC were crowned 2019–20 A-League champions for the second year in a row. Rhyan Grant won the Joe Marston Medal having scored the winning goal in the 2020 final. Sydney FC were also 2019–20 premiers. Their accomplishments qualified them into the 2021 AFC Champions League Group Stage. Melbourne City, who came second, and Brisbane Roar who were the third highest ranked Australian team qualified for the 2021 AFC Champions League qualifying play-offs. However, due to the COVID-19 pandemic, the Australian teams withdrew from the Champions League.

All games of the 2020 finals series were played at Bankwest Stadium due to the COVID-19 pandemic in Australia and New Zealand.

Elimination Finals

Semi-finals

Grand Final

2021 

For the ninth straight year, the finals series used the same six team knock-out finals system it adopted in the 2012–13 season. The winner of the finals series, Melbourne City were crowned 2020–21 A-League champions for the second year in a row. Nathaniel Atkinson won the Joe Marston Medal having scored the opening goal in the 2021 final. Melbourne City were also 2019–20 premiers. Their accomplishments qualified them into the 2022 AFC Champions League Group Stage. Sydney FC, who came second, and the 2021 FFA Cup winners qualified for the 2022 AFC Champions League qualifying play-offs.

Melbourne City's home semi-final against Macarthur FC was moved to Netstrata Jubilee Stadium as a result of the COVID-19 pandemic in Victoria. This also resulted in the Grand Final being played at AAMI Park at a crowd of 50% its full capacity.

Elimination Finals

Semi-finals

Grand Final

Appearances by club 
Bold indicates they won the finals series that year. Team names in italics indicates the club is a former A-League member.

Notes

References 

A-League Men
A-League Men lists